Desiree Miller (born August 12, 1987) is a paralympic athlete from United States of America competing mainly in wheelchair basketball. Miller is the oldest of four children from Eugene and Denise Miller, and has a rare form of spina bifida. Miller believed her disability would bar her from sports activities until she discovered wheelchair basketball.

Miller competed at the 2012 Summer Paralympics and at the 2016 Summer Paralympics. As the captain of the U.S. Women's Wheelchair Basketball Team, the team won the team gold medal in women's wheelchair basketball.

Miller was married to Mareike Miller (Adermann), who is a member of the German Wheelchair Basketball Team.

References

Paralympic gold medalists for the United States
Living people
Paralympic medalists in wheelchair basketball
1987 births
Medalists at the 2016 Summer Paralympics
Wheelchair basketball players at the 2016 Summer Paralympics
Paralympic wheelchair basketball players of the United States